Glowing Embers is a Malaysian television series co-produced by ntv7 and Double Vision. This 24 episode drama serial tells of a small town, Kuala Sepetang, charcoal production business.
Fei Long, Ah Koo, Yi Yi, Fat Miao, and Ah Dong are a group of childhood friends who grow up together there, where their playground were the charcoal kilns, the mangrove, rivers and traditional boat factories.
It was aired every Monday to Thursday, at 10:00 pm on Malaysia's ntv7 starting 9 March 2010.

Cast
 Debbie Goh
 Frederick Lee
 Melvin Sia
 Henley Hii
 Wymen Yang

References

Chinese-language drama television series in Malaysia
2010 Malaysian television series debuts
2010 Malaysian television series endings
NTV7 original programming